Pertev Mehmet Paşa Mosque, also known as Yeni Cuma Cami meaning "New Friday Mosque" in Turkish, is a 16th-century Ottoman mosque in the town of Izmit, Turkey. The architect was Mimar Sinan. It was built for Pertev Mehmed Paşa, an Ottoman vizier during the reigns of sultan Suleyman I and Selim II. The construction was finished in 1579. The mosque is part of a larger complex (Külliye) which originally included a madrasa, hammam, caravanserai, fountain and a lower education school. The mosque itself is a single domed structure and the dome has 24 windows. The minaret was damaged during the 1999 İzmit earthquake.

See also
List of Friday mosques designed by Mimar Sinan

References

External links

Pertev Mehmet Paşa Külliyesi, Archnet

Mosques in Turkey
Religious buildings and structures completed in 1579
Mosque buildings with domes
Mimar Sinan buildings
Mosques completed in the 1570s